Nikoloz Basilashvili was the defending champion and successfully defended his title, defeating Andrey Rublev in the final, 7–5, 4–6, 6–3. En route to doing so, Basilashvili saved two match points against Alexander Zverev in the semifinals.

Seeds

Draw

Finals

Top half

Bottom half

Qualifying

Seeds

Qualifiers

Lucky loser
  Alejandro Davidovich Fokina

Qualifying draw

First qualifier

Second qualifier

Third qualifier

Fourth qualifier

References

External Links
Main draw
Qualifying draw

Hamburg European Open - Singles
2019 Hamburg European Open